Tudan may refer to:

 Tudan, Sistan and Baluchestan
 Tudan, West Azerbaijan
 Dyuden the Mongol ruler